Little Miss Roughneck is a 1938 American drama.

Plot summary
Budding child vaudeville performer Foxine LaRue (Edith Fellows) and her mother Gertrude LaRue (Margaret Irving) will do anything to get Foxine into show business.  Together, they stage a kidnapping hoax. Foxine is nowhere to be found, having hitched a ride on a freight train after mailing a ransom note.  Overheard talking about the hoax, Gertrude is arrested by the police. Pascual Orozco (Leo Carrillo) finds Foxine, and she tells him she escaped from an orphanage. He tries to drive her back to the orphanage, but she steals his car. Orozco is also arrested for the kidnapping. A mob tries to hang Orozco, and Foxine finally confesses.

Cast
Edith Fellows – Foxine LaRue
Jacqueline Wells – Mary LaRue
Margaret Irving – Gertrude LaRue
Leo Carrillo – Pascual Orozco

References

External links
 
 
 
 

1938 films
1938 drama films
American black-and-white films
Columbia Pictures films
American drama films
1930s English-language films
Films directed by Aubrey Scotto
1930s American films